Namesco Ltd (names.co.uk) provides professional online services for individuals and businesses including domain name registration, web hosting, website building tools, email services, ecommerce solutions and a range of managed and unmanaged servers.

History

Namesco was founded by Richard and Rachel Suthering as a small Internet startup named "Names.co Internet Services Limited" originally based in North East England. In 1997 another Internet startup was founded by Kevin Savage, Jason Smith and John Sewell named Phase8.com "Webcall.com Limited" based in Worcester.

Following the dot com boom, Names.co Internet Services Limited became a Public Limited Company and floated on the London Unlisted Securities Market with a new name of Namesco Internet Plc in 2000. The following year, they acquired Phase8.com "Webcall.com Limited" for the sum of £2,450,000.

Despite acquiring smaller web hosting companies and resellers along the way, including SmartChoiceNet, the "publicly quoted" Namesco struggled to be viable citing the increasingly competitive nature of the domain name and web hosting business, and the additional costs of maintaining listed status as the reasons for a lack of profitability.

In 2002, it was rumoured that Ian Gowrie-Smith, Australian chairman of drug company SkyePharma was planning a reverse takeover of Namesco with the assistance of its chief executive and finance director, David Lees.

Trading of Namesco shares on AIM were suspended on 19 December 2003   prior to the announcement of Gowrie-Smith’s action. A Vietnamese gold mining company, Larchland, was injected into the company in a £19.6million reverse takeover deal that saw the business renamed as Triple Junction PLC. Namesco was hived down into a subsidiary and sold to Womerah Limited.

As a privately owned company, Namesco then had the capital to make new acquisitions as part of their growth strategy. In July 2004, they acquired NamesWeb; a small domain and web hosting business, and on 17 September 2004 they doubled the size of their internet business by acquiring a competitor, the local and profitable Malvern based Simply.com Limited for GBP£2.15M. Simply.com Limited at the time managed 91,000 domain names and 32,000 active customers.

In March 2005, the assets of domain and hosting business Net2 Ltd were acquired followed by the acquisition of broadband business NDO Ltd in July. As NDO also sold domain names, web hosting and dialup internet access, this acquisition allowed Namesco to offer its customers ADSL services.

In July 2007, Namesco Ltd was purchased by Register.it Spa, an Italian Internet company owned by Dada, for £24.5million. Having previously acquired Spanish company Nominalia, this added a substantial UK operation to the division.

Further acquisitions followed, including Xsession.com Limited in October, the assets of Serve360.com in November, and the assets of Ukdomains.com in December.

On 28 May 2008, Namesco Ltd acquired the assets of Register365, Ireland's largest hosting provider, through its subsidiary Namesco Ireland Ltd, adding 40,000 domains to its portfolio. This made Namesco the fourth largest UK provider of domain names and shared hosting services.

In 2010, Poundhost was acquired as a subsidiary of Namesco Limited, further consolidating their presence in the European market and opening up the potential of the US market, with 30% of Poundhost’s high-end customer base residing in America.

In 2014, Namesco’s broadband customer base was acquired by The Phone Co-op; Commercial Director of Namesco, Stephen Ewart, said this was to enable the company to focus on their core product ranges of web hosting, domain name registry, email and website building services.

In 2019, Namesco Ltd became part of team.blue, a European group of brands enabling entrepreneurs to succeed online. As a group, they operate across 15 countries, manage over 1.9 million domains and host more than 650,000 websites.

Security problems
On 13 January 2012 Namesco suffered a security breach which resulted in over 100 customers needing to cancel their cards. "...card details were leaked after hackers broke into Namesco's systems, Namesco warned that users' account administration email, account names, dates of birth, contact numbers and postal addresses may also have been exposed by the breach". Namesco notified the Information Commissioners Office about this loss, and customers were advised to update their passwords and cancel their card details. However, the company faced criticism over the format of their warning, which bore similarities to emails used in "phishing" scams.

References

External links 
 names.co.uk website
 team.blue website

Internet service providers of the United Kingdom
Companies based in Worcester, England
Companies established in 1997